Mt. Nebo is a historic home located at Poolesville, Montgomery County, Maryland, United States. It is a large -story gable-roofed frame dwelling constructed in three periods: the main block, dating to the second quarter of the 19th century; a -story wing extends from the rear of the main block, which appears to have been an earlier dwelling from the late 18th century; and a two-story addition was made to the east gable end of the main block around the turn of the 20th century. Also on the property is a mid-19th-century log smokehouse and the remains of an early terraced "waterfall" garden. The property derives additional significance from its association with the White family through the latter half of the 19th century. Joseph White (1825–1903) was a locally prominent supporter of the Confederate cause during the American Civil War.
Mt. Nebo was listed on the National Register of Historic Places in 1985.

References

External links
, including photo in 1966, at Maryland Historical Trust website

Houses completed in the 18th century
Houses completed in the 19th century
Houses on the National Register of Historic Places in Maryland
Houses in Montgomery County, Maryland
Georgian architecture in Maryland
National Register of Historic Places in Montgomery County, Maryland